Sankt Magdalena am Lemberg is a former municipality in the district of Hartberg in Styria, Austria. It was united with Buch-Geiseldorf on January 1, 2013 to form the new municipality Buch-St. Magdalena in Hartberg-Fürstenfeld District.

References

Cities and towns in Hartberg-Fürstenfeld District

bs:Buch-Sankt Magdalena